KLIA Expressway, E6 and Federal Route 26, is an expressway in Sepang, Selangor, Malaysia. It serves as the main access road to Kuala Lumpur International Airport (KLIA), as well as the nearby Sepang International Circuit and Bandar Enstek.

Starting from the Kilometre Zero or A Zero (A0) at KLIA Interchange of the North–South Expressway Central Link E6, the first  of the expressway is maintained as part of the North–South Expressway Central Link E6 by PLUS Expressway Berhad. The remaining sections of expressway connecting to KLIA is numbered as Federal Route 26 and maintained by the Malaysian Public Works Department.

Features
 6-lane carriageway
 110 km/h speed limit on PLUS section
 Variable Message Signs (VMS)
 Emergency telephones
 Many billboards along this expressway
 8 lanes of dual carriageway from KLIA airport boundary to KLIA Main Terminal Building

At most sections, the Federal Route 26 was built under the JKR R5 road standard, with a speed limit to 90 km/h.

There is one overlap: KLIA Interchange–KLIA airport boundary : E6 North–South Expressway Central Link.

There are no alternate routes or sections with motorcycle lanes.

List of interchanges and laybys

Original section

Dual carriageway section

One way single carriageway section (KLIA bound)

One way single carriageway section (Kuala Lumpur bound)

KLIA 2 Section

One way single carriageway section (klia2 bound)

One way single carriageway section (Kuala Lumpur and KLIA bound)

See also
 Kuala Lumpur International Airport (KLIA)
 KLIA Outer Ring Road
 Jalan KLIA 1
 KLIA East Road

References

Expressways and highways in the Klang Valley
Highways in Malaysia
Kuala Lumpur International Airport
Roads in Selangor
Sepang District